Ballard High School is a high school in Seattle, Washington, United States, located in the Ballard neighborhood.

History
Ballard High School began in the fall of 1901, when the Ballard School District added grades eleven and twelve to the already existing Central School, creating the first four-year high school in the Ballard area. The very small school, soon to be known as Ballard High School, was located at 5308 Tallman Avenue. There were three people on the faculty, including the principal, Harry F. Giles. The first graduating class had four students and held its commencement on June 23, 1902.

By 1905, enrollment had grown to 80 students. Ballard became part of the city of Seattle in 1907, and the high school became part of the Seattle Public School System.

Ballard High School moved to its present location during Christmas vacation 1915. The school could accommodate 1,000 students. Three hundred of them were transferred from Lincoln.

The building was remodeled three times, once in 1925, then again in 1941 and for the last time in 1959. At that time, the student body had grown to over 2,000.

That structure was demolished in the summer of 1997 due to asbestos contamination, and was replaced with the current facility. The student body was housed in the old Lincoln High School building during the 1997–98 and 1998-99 school years.  Lincoln was undergoing a remodel to become a middle school. The students who attended Ballard at Lincoln High had no bells to mark classes, limited classrooms, and cubically separated classrooms in the library and gymnasium facilities for the 1997–98 school year. This was due to the fact that half of the facility at Lincoln was still closed for renovations (the half that held the majority of the divided classrooms). Finally in September 1999, Ballard High School returned to 1418 NW 65th Street to occupy a new building with the ability to accommodate evolving technology and more than 1,500 students. There are several classrooms that do not have windows.

1994 shooting
The first murder ever of a student on Seattle School District property happened in 1994 outside Ballard High School.  Then 16-year-old Brian Ronquillo, a student at Shorewood High School, fired a gun eight times into a group of students as a car he was in drove past Ballard High School. Melissa Fernandes, a 16-year-old Ballard student, was shot and killed, although she was not the intended target, a 16-year-old male student was also injured. Ronquillo was sentenced to 51 years in prison for the gang-related shooting and then 19-year old Cesar Sarausad who was the car driver was sentenced to more than 27 years in prison.

Academic programs

Academies
Ballard High maintains two formal academies on campus: The Academy of Finance and the Maritime Academy. Both comprise an integrated curriculum across content areas. Students enrolled in these academies are part of the Ballard student population but have chosen to participate in a specific content area of focus.

Notable alumni
 Thomas Alberg – venture capitalist
 Josh Barnett – former UFC Heavyweight champion and current mixed martial artist
 Don Bies – former PGA Tour player
 Arnold L. Bjorklund – World War II officer
 Handwalla Bwana - Kenyan footballer (Nashville SC)
 John O. Creighton – former NASA astronaut
 Silme Domingo - UW Honors Grad, Labor Activist, Assassinated in 1981 at Pioneer Square office of ILWU Local 37 by corrupt union members on orders from Philippine President Marcos.
 Paul Enquist – 1984 men's double scull Olympic gold medal winner (double partner Brad Alan Lewis)
 Richard Gilkey – painter
 Halvor Hagen – former NFL player
 Art Hansen – painter and lithographer
 George Irvine – former ABA player (Virginia)
 Chet Johnson – former MLB player (St. Louis Browns)
 Earl Johnson – former MLB player (Boston Red Sox, Detroit Tigers)
 Thomas McAdams – Master Chief Boatswain's Mate, U.S. Coast Guard
 Dori Monson – KIRO and Seahawk radio announcer
 Jean Smart – actress
 Karsten Solheim – founder of PING golf club company

References

External links

 
History of Ballard High School

Ballard, Seattle
High schools in King County, Washington
Public high schools in Washington (state)
Seattle Public Schools